Jo Hersey (born 9 March 1967) is an Australian politician. She is a member for electoral division of Katherine in the Northern Territory Legislative Assembly.

|}

Hersey was born in Adelaide, but moved to the Northern Territory when she was young. The family returned to Adelaide after a few years, but Hersey returned to Katherine after she married. Before being elected, she was a hairdresser, continuing a family tradition that stretched back 3 generations.

In the 2020 Northern Territory general election Hersey won a close race in the seat of Katherine to be elected to Legislative Assembly for the Country Liberal Party.

References

Living people
1967 births
Members of the Northern Territory Legislative Assembly
Country Liberal Party members of the Northern Territory Legislative Assembly
21st-century Australian politicians
Hairdressers
21st-century Australian women politicians
Women members of the Northern Territory Legislative Assembly